Sarband is a German early music ensemble with musicians from 7 nations, focusing on musical connections between Orient & Occident; Jewish, Christian & Muslim music.  
The group was founded in 1986 by Dr. Vladimir Ivanoff. Since then, Sarband has performed more than 500 concerts on four continents and released 14 CDs.

Awards 
Grammy Nomination 1992, Echo Klassik 2003, Echo Klassik 2006, Premio Mousiké 2007, German Worldmusic Award Ruth 2008.

Discography 
 2016: All Roads lead Home - Christmas Compilation
 2009: The Arabian Passion according to J. S. Bach 
 2006: Vox Feminae 
 2005: King's Singers & Sarband: Sacred Bridges 
 2005: Concerto Koeln & Sarband: The Waltz
 2005: Ensemble Sarband: Satie En Orient
 2003: Concerto Koeln & Sarband: Dream of the Orient
 2003: Pilgrims of the Soul
 2001: Alla Turca: Oriental Obsession
 2000: Danse Gothique
 1998: Fallen Women
 1997: Sacred Women: Women as Composers and Performers of Medieval Chant (Dorian Recordings DOR 93235)
 1996: Sepharad
 1995: Sephardic Songs
 1994: Llibre Vermell de Montserrat
 1992: Music of the Emperors
 1990: Cantico
 1989: Mystère de Voix Bulgares & Sarband: Mystères

External links
 Ensemble Sarband
 tour schedule
 Sarband's CD distribution

Instrumental early music groups
Musical groups established in 1986
1986 establishments in Germany